Oscar Otte was the defending champion but chose not to defend his title.

Borna Gojo won the title after defeating Lukáš Klein 7–6(7–4), 6–3 in the final.

Seeds

Draw

Finals

Top half

Bottom half

References

External links
Main draw
Qualifying draw

Sparkassen ATP Challenger - 1
2022 Singles